Lists of animated feature films released in the 1990s organized by year of release:
 List of animated feature films of 1990
 List of animated feature films of 1991
 List of animated feature films of 1992
 List of animated feature films of 1993
 List of animated feature films of 1994
 List of animated feature films of 1995
 List of animated feature films of 1996
 List of animated feature films of 1997
 List of animated feature films of 1998
 List of animated feature films of 1999

See also
List of highest-grossing animated films of the 1990s

References

1990s
Animated